Faustine Noël (born 25 December 1993) is a French para badminton player who competes in international level events.

Achievements

Paralympic Games 
Mixed doubles

World Championships 
Women's singles

Women's doubles

Mixed doubles

European Championships 
Women's singles

Mixed doubles

References

Notes

External links
 

1993 births
Living people
Sportspeople from Nantes
French female badminton players
French para-badminton players
Paralympic badminton players of France
Badminton players at the 2020 Summer Paralympics
Paralympic medalists in badminton
Medalists at the 2020 Summer Paralympics
Paralympic silver medalists for France